Agricultural Involution: The Processes of Ecological Change in Indonesia is one of the most famous of the early works of Clifford Geertz. Its principal thesis is that many centuries of intensifying wet-rice cultivation in Indonesia had produced greater social complexity without significant technological or political change, a process Geertz terms—"involution". The term has drawn significant attention in China since its introduction in China's social sciences research, making it one of the most popular buzzwords in China.

Content 
Written for a particular US-funded project on the local developments and following the modernisation theory of Walt Whitman Rostow, Geertz examines in this book the agricultural system in Indonesia. The two dominant forms of agriculture are swidden and sawah. Swidden is also known as slash and burn and sawah involves irrigated rice paddies. The geographical location of these different types is important. Sawah is the dominant form in both Java and Bali where nearly three quarters of Indonesia's population live, and swidden more common in the less central regions.

Having looked at the agricultural system, the book turns to an examination of the systems historical development. Of particular note is Geertz's discussion of what he famously describes as the process of "agricultural involution". This is his description of the process in Java where both the external economic demands of the Dutch rulers and the internal pressures due to population growth led to intensification rather than change. What this amounted was increasing the labour intensity in the paddies, increasing output per area but not per head. In his book, Geertz credits the term to Alexander Goldenweiser:

Critics 
This was politically the most controversial text of Geertz as the Modjokuto Project (1953-1959) was a CIA funded program for CENIS at MIT. However, in an interview to David Price he asserted that he was not involved with the political side of the project. Late in his career, Geertz reflected that the book had become an "orphan," widely read and criticized without reference to his larger body of work.

In popular culture 
The term involution was introduced to social sciences research about China in the 1985 book The peasant economy and social change in North China by Philip C. C. Huang at UCLA, in which he uses it to explain why family farming, rather than industrial agriculture, dominates the agriculture in North China. The term is again used in Prasenjit Duara's 1988 book Culture, Power, and the State: Rural North China, 1900-1942, where Duara describes an involution of the state in the forms of its rural government. Since then, the term involution has drawn great attention in China.

Since then, the term has been gradually extended to be used to describe a variety of aspects of the highly competitive Chinese society. In 2020, it has become one of the most popular buzzword on Weibo, where it is used to describe the feeling of exhaustion in an overly competitive society.

References
 Agricultural Involution: The Processes of Ecological Change in Indonesia. By Clifford Geertz. Berkeley and Los Angeles, California: University of California Press, 1963.

Notes

1963 non-fiction books
1963 in the environment
Agricultural Involution: the process of ecological change in Indonesia
Agricultural Involution: the process of ecological change in Indonesia
Books about Indonesia
University of California Press books